Yemen competed at the 1992 Summer Olympics in Barcelona, Spain.  Before Yemenite reunification in 1990, North Yemen and South Yemen had competed as independent teams.

Competitors
The following is the list of number of competitors in the Games.

Athletics

Track & road events

Judo

References

Official Olympic Reports

Nations at the 1992 Summer Olympics
1992
Oly